Peter Hogan (born June 8, 1935) is a sports shooter who represents the United States Virgin Islands. He competed in the men's 50 metre rifle, prone event at the 1976 Summer Olympics.

References

1935 births
Living people
United States Virgin Islands male sport shooters
Olympic shooters of the United States Virgin Islands
Shooters at the 1976 Summer Olympics
Place of birth missing (living people)